Glina is a river in central Croatia and Bosnia and Herzegovina, a right tributary of Kupa.

Glina rises in the mountainous forested areas of Kordun, northeast of Slunj, near the village of Glinsko Vrelo (lit. "the source of Glina"). It flows north before turning east near the village of Veljunska Glina. As it reaches the village of Maljevac, it touches the border of Bosnia and Herzegovina (north of Velika Kladuša), whose path it forms (roughly) for about  up to the village of Katinovac. There it turns northeast, passes by Topusko and finally the eponymous town of Glina.

References

Rivers of Croatia
Rivers of Bosnia and Herzegovina
International rivers of Europe
Landforms of Karlovac County
Landforms of Sisak-Moslavina County
Bosnia and Herzegovina–Croatia border
Border rivers